The men's sprint competition at the Biathlon World Championships 2019 was held on 9 March 2019 at 16:30 local time.

Results

References

Men's sprint